is a Japanese horror adventure game by Success Corporation, released exclusively for the PlayStation 2 in Japan on October 21, 2004. A reduced price "popular edition," included in developer and publisher SUCCESS' SuperLite 2000 Series, was released on October 27, 2005. The title refers to the mythical red string of fate.

In addition, this new version will receive an official English language option for the very first time, and be given a release outside Japan.

Story
To arrange the inheritance because of the loss of her mother, orphaned high school student Kei Hatō heads for her late father's house in Hemizuka. In the train on the way there, Kei has a mysterious dream of a huge tree and a woman who seems to be lost in sadness. In Hemizuka, Kei learns the secret concealed in her own blood through various meeting with an Oni Slayer, a friend of her late mother, a young girl accompanied by a white fox, and even the mysterious girl from her dreams. Throughout the story Kei is antagonized by the twin oni Nozomi and Mikage. Akai Ito's story varies greatly based upon the player's decisions, which not only affect the flow of the story but also the ending the player receives (several of which suggest romantic feelings among the female characters).

Character
[[Image:Akai ito light novel.jpg|thumb|Akai Ito'''s main characters, as depicted in the novel adaptation.]]
 (CV: Miyu Matsuki)
The main character of the story, Kei is a rather careless person, which is quite ironic considering her favorite phrase is "always be prepared".
 (CV: Yūko Minaguchi)
The mysterious girl from Kei's dreams.
 (CV: Akeno Watanabe)
The Oni Slayer Kei meets at the train station, her sword is the very bane of the oni.
 (CV: Rie Kugimiya)
A girl half Kei's age, accompanied by a white fox. Kei meets her in her father's now abandoned house.
 (CV: Asami Sanada)
A friend of Kei's deceased mother. She goes by the nickname "West".
 (CV: Megumi Kobayashi)
Twin oni and the antagonists of the story.
 (CV: Kazutaka Ishii)
A mysterious male, later known as Kei's brother called Hakuka.
 (CV: Nana Furuhara)
 (CV: Mamiko Noto)
 (CV: Miyuki Sawashiro)

Staff
Character design / Original picture : HAL
Script : Tomoyuki Fumotogawa
Music : MANYO (Little Wing)
Background : J.C.Staff

Music
Opening theme song 『 Mawaru Sekai de (廻る世界で) 』 by Haruka Shimotsuki / Riya
Ending theme song 『 Tabiji no Hate'' (旅路の果て) 』 by Haruka Shimotsuki / Riya

Adaptations

Manga
Akai Ito has also received several manga adaptations: a one-shot by Muttri Moony published in the July 2004 issue of Yuri Shimai, by the name "Swear"; and a short manga published in the May and June 2007 issues of Monthly Comic Rush. A special anthology was created for a limited edition version Akai Ito, the anthology featured various stories from different artists.

Web Novel
A free web novel of Akai Ito was released on Success' official Akai Ito website, it follows one of the storylines accessible when playing the video game.

Drama CD
One drama CD has been released. It was first released as a Limited Edition version in October 2005 and later a regular version was released on December 26, 2006.

Notes and references

External links
Akai Ito official website 
SUCCESS official site 
Aoi Shiro Official Site 
ZoharContact's Akai Ito Fan Translation 
Aoishiro/Akai Ito HD official website  

2004 video games
2007 manga
Bishōjo games
Fantasy video games
2000s horror video games
LGBT-related video games
Japan-exclusive video games
Manga series
PlayStation 2 games
PlayStation Network games
Romance video games
Success (company) games
Video games developed in Japan
Video games featuring female protagonists
Visual novels
Yuri (genre) anime and manga
Yuri (genre) video games
Hamster Corporation games
Single-player video games